This is a list of things named after Sophus Lie. Sophus Lie (1842 – 1899), a mathematician, is the eponym of all of the things (and topics) listed below.

Carathéodory–Jacobi–Lie theorem
Lie algebra
Lie-* algebra
Lie algebra bundle
Lie algebra cohomology
Lie algebra representation
Lie algebroid
Lie bialgebra
Lie coalgebra
Lie conformal algebra
Lie superalgebra
Abelian Lie algebra
Affine Lie algebra
Anyonic Lie algebra
Compact Lie algebra
Complex Lie algebra
Exceptional Lie algebra
Finite-dimensional and infinite-dimensional Lie algebras
Free Lie algebra
Graded Lie algebra
Differential graded Lie algebra
Homotopy Lie algebra
Malcev Lie algebra
Modular Lie algebra
Monster Lie algebra
Nilpotent Lie algebra
Nilradical of a Lie algebra
Orthogonal symmetric Lie algebra
Parabolic Lie algebra
Pre-Lie algebra
Quadratic Lie algebra
Quasi-Frobenius Lie algebra
Quasi-Lie algebra
Real Lie algebras
Reductive Lie algebra
Restricted Lie algebra
Semisimple Lie algebra
Split Lie algebra
Symplectic Lie algebra
Tangent Lie group
Tate Lie algebra
Toral Lie algebra
Lie bracket of vector fields
Lie derivative
Lie group
Lie group decomposition
Lie groupoid
Lie subgroup
Complex Lie group
Local Lie group
Poisson–Lie group
Real Lie groups
Simple Lie group
Solvable Lie algebra
Special linear Lie algebra
Special orthogonal Lie algebra
Symmetric Lie group
Tangent Lie group
Lie point symmetry
Lie product formula
Lie ring
Lie sphere geometry
Lie theory
Lie–Kolchin theorem
Lie–Palais theorem
Lie's theorem
Lie's third theorem
Lie transform

Other
26955 Lie

See also
Glossary of Lie algebras
List of Lie groups topics
List of simple Lie groups
Table of Lie groups

Lie, Sophus